Cintalapa is a town and one of the 122 Municipalities of Chiapas, in southern Mexico. It covers an area of 2404.6 km².

As of 2010, the municipality had a total population of 78,114, up from 64,013 as of 2005. 

The municipality had 943 localities, the largest of which (with 2010 populations in parentheses) were: Cintalapa de Figueroa (42,467), Lázaro Cárdenas (3,002), classified as urban, and Cereso 14 (El Amate) (2,243), Villamorelos (1,677), Nueva Tenochtitlán (Rizo de Oro) (1,640), Emiliano Zapata (1,507), Pomposo Castellanos (1,489), Francisco I. Madero (1,444), Mérida (1,412), and Vista Hermosa (1,149), classified as rural.

References

Municipalities of Chiapas